Lionel H. "Leo" Smith (May 13, 1859 in Brooklyn, NY – August 30, 1935 in Brooklyn, NY) was a Major League Baseball shortstop. He played for the Rochester Broncos in 1890.

External links

1859 births
1935 deaths
Rochester Broncos players
19th-century baseball players
Major League Baseball shortstops
Trenton (minor league baseball) players
Trenton Trentonians players
Newark Domestics players
Newark Little Giants players
Newark Trunkmakers players
Buffalo Bisons (minor league) players
Providence Grays (minor league) players
Troy Washerwomen players
Scranton Indians players
Atlanta Crackers players
Newark Colts players
New Haven Texas Steers players
Baseball players from New York (state)
Sportspeople from Brooklyn
Baseball players from New York City